An Evening at L'Abbaye is an album of duets by Gordon Heath (September 20, 1918 - August 27, 1991)
and Lee Payant (1924 - December 14, 1976), released by Elektra Records in 1957.  L'Abbaye was a popular Left Bank nightclub in Paris, opened in 1949 by Heath and Payant and where the two performed folk songs, spirituals, and blues in English and French for 27 years until Payant died from cancer in 1976.

References

 Biography: Heath, Gordon 1918-1991
 Gordon Heath IMDB entry
 Gordon Heath & Lee Payant Discography
 Gordon Heath Papers, 1913-1992, Special Collections and University Archives, W.E.B. Du Bois Library, University of Massachusetts, Amherst

External links
 Illustrated Gordon Heath & Lee Payant discography

1957 live albums
Gordon Heath albums
Lee Payant albums
Elektra Records live albums